Gary Clayton Kelly (born March 12, 1955) is an American business executive. He is the chairman and former chief executive officer of Southwest Airlines.

Personal life
Kelly was born in San Antonio on March 12, 1955. Kelly received a Bachelor of Business Administration in Accounting from the University of Texas at Austin. He is a Certified Public Accountant.

Kelly first met his wife Carol in eighth grade. They married in 1976. Together, they have two daughters.

Career
Prior to his work at Southwest, Kelly worked as an Audit Manager for Arthur Young & Co. and a controller for Sterling Software.

Kelly first joined Southwest Airlines in 1986 as a controller. In 1989, Kelly was promoted to Chief Financial Officer and Vice President of Finance. In 2001, he was promoted to Executive Vice President. Kelly spent 3 years in this role until he was promoted to become Southwest's fifth CEO and vice chairman in 2004 replacing James Parker who succeeded Herb Kelleher in 2001.

Kelly was named Chairman of the Board of Directors of Southwest Airlines on May 21, 2008, replacing co-founder Herb Kelleher. Gary Kelly also became president of Southwest Airlines the same year, replacing Colleen Barrett when her contract expired on July 15, 2008.

As CEO, Kelly has guided the airline to become the largest carrier of domestic passengers in the United States. He has led the company through a number of transformative, large-scale initiatives including the revamp of the airline’s Rapid Rewards program,  the introduction of the Boeing 737–800 and 737 MAX  aircraft to Southwest’s fleet, the acquisition of AirTran Airways, the launching of Southwest's first international service, an update to the airline’s branding,  the adoption of the Amadeus reservation system, and large expansion projects at the company’s corporate headquarters in Dallas.

On January 10, 2017, Kelly announced changes to the Company's executive Leadership ranks with Thomas M. Nealon named as President and Michael G. Van de Ven named as the airline's Chief Operating Officer. These changes were effective immediately.  Kelly retained the title of Chairman and Chief Executive Officer.

After agreeing to take a salary cut to prevent employee furloughs, his base salary reduced to zero until the end of 2021. After Congress passed additional Payroll Support Program (PSP) measures, the SWA BoD retroactively reinstated Gary Kelly's full salary.

On 23 June 2021, Kelly announced he would relinquish his role as CEO in February 2022, with Bob Jordan announced to take his place at that time. He will remain as Executive Chairman of the board until at least 2026.

On December 15, 2021, Kelly testified against mask mandates on airplanes at a Senate Committee on Commerce, Science, and Transportation hearing while sitting unmasked next to other unmasked senior airline executives opposed to mask mandates; two days later he tested positive for COVID-19.

Awards and recognition
Kelly was named one of the best CEOs in America for 2008, 2009 and 2010 by Institutional Investor magazine and serves on the President's Council of Jobs and Competitiveness.

In 2014, Kelly received the Advertising Innovation and Marketing Excellence (AIME) Award.

Kelly was the 2016 recipient of the Tony Jannus Award for distinguished achievement in commercial air transportation.

In 2017, Fortune named Kelly the #3 most underrated CEO in America (after Satya Nadella and Jeff Bezos) based on a survey of Fortune 500 CEOs asking them which of their fellow CEOs do not get enough credit. Kelly received 85 votes.

On February 18, 2020, Gary Kelly was named as the recipient of the 2020 Philanthropic Leadership Award from The Ireland Funds.

On October 25, 2021, Gary Kelly was the recipient of the 2021 Lifetime Achievement Award from 3BL Media.

References

External links
 Gary C. Kelly's executive profile
 CEO of the Year (Again!): Gary Kelly of Southwest Airlines
 Nuts About Southwest Blog
 Gary C. Kelly Shares His Views on Leadership (Video)
 Gary C. Kelly on Becoming CEO of Southwest Airlines (Video)
 Gary C. Kelly Describes A Story of Caring (Video) 
 Southwest Airlines Employee Testimonials (Video)

American airline chief executives
Living people
1955 births
McCombs School of Business alumni
Southwest Airlines people
American chief financial officers